The Andino Mall bombing happened on the afternoon of 17 June 2017 in Bogotá, Colombia. Three young women were killed and 9 other people were injured. One of those killed was French, the other two were Colombian. The two Colombians died in the hospital due to their injuries. The bomb exploded behind a toilet bowl of the second floor  women's bathroom at approximately 5 pm.

Responsibility
Police arrested eight members of a small far-left urban guerilla group called the People’s Revolutionary Movement (Movimiento Revolucionario del Pueblo, MRP) a week after the bombing. The group has only been known since 2015 and are suspected of 14 other attacks in Colombia.

Reactions 
In response to the bombing, Colombian President Juan Manuel Santos said "we won't let terrorism fright us". Bogotá mayor Enrique Peñalosa called it a "cowardly terrorist bombing". The United Nations condemned the attack and said the following: "The UN in Colombia regrets and repudiates this act of violence and reiterates that terrorism in all its forms and manifestations constitutes a threat to peace and security. We remain determined to continue to support Colombians and their government in their efforts to build sustainable and lasting peace in the country." President of France Emmanuel Macron tweeted on the French woman that died, "At 23, a volunteer in Bogota, a compatriot lost her life there in an explosion. Sadness and condolences for her loved ones." Mexican President Enrique Peña Nieto also expressed himself in a tweet in Spanish saying "México condena enérgicamente el acto de violencia cometido en Bogotá. Nuestra solidaridad con los familiares de las víctimas y los heridos." (Mexico strongly condemns the act of violence committed in Bogotá. Our solidarity with the families of the victims and those injured.) There were also other countries and ambassadors that publicly condemned the attack through social media.

Victims

References

2017 murders in Colombia
21st century in Bogotá
Attacks on buildings and structures in 2017
Building bombings in Colombia
Events in Bogotá
Far-left terrorism
Improvised explosive device bombings in 2017
June 2017 crimes in South America
June 2017 events in South America
Murder in Bogotá
Shopping mall bombings
Terrorist incidents in Bogotá
Terrorist incidents in Colombia in the 2010s
 
Attacks in South America in 2017